John McChlery was a mayor of Bulawayo and later member of the Southern Rhodesian Legislative Council for Marandellas in the early 20th century. Described as having liberal views, he was a member of the Responsible Government Association, and later served on the delegation from the Legislative Council to negotiate with the Colonial Office, prior to the 1922 Southern Rhodesian government referendum.

References

Year of birth missing
Year of death missing
Rhodesian politicians
Mayors of Bulawayo
People from Bulawayo